Napoléon is a 1955 French historical epic film directed by Sacha Guitry that depicts major events in the life of Napoleon.

Napoleon is played by two actors, Daniel Gélin as a young man and Raymond Pellegrin in later life; the switch takes place during a scene at a barber. Director/actor Guitry played the role of Talleyrand, controversial diplomat and first Prime Minister of France, narrating the story from a drawing room as if having just heard of Napoleon's death on the island of Saint Helena in 1821. Guitry had played Talleyrand before, in 1948's Le Diable boiteux. Yves Montand appears as Marshal Lefebvre and Maria Schell as Marie-Louise of Austria. The film also has cameo appearances by a number of notable actors, particularly Erich von Stroheim as Ludwig van Beethoven, and Orson Welles as Napoleon's British jailor, Sir Hudson Lowe.

The English version is a contemporary dub made as part of the original production, but does not run as long as the French version.

Plot
The book follows the life of Napoleon from his early life in Corsica to his death at Saint Helena  in May 1821. The book is notable for its use of location shooting for numerous scenes, especially at the French estates of Malmaison and Fontainebleau, the Palace of Versailles, and sites of Napoleonic battles including Austerlitz and Waterloo.

Cast

References

External links 
 
 
 
 Capsule at Fondation Napoléon

1955 films
1950s historical drama films
1950s biographical drama films
French historical drama films
French biographical drama films
French epic films
Italian historical drama films
Films about Napoleon
Films directed by Sacha Guitry
Films produced by Angelo Rizzoli
Cultural depictions of Charles Maurice de Talleyrand-Périgord
Cultural depictions of Joséphine de Beauharnais
Cultural depictions of Klemens von Metternich
Depictions of Ludwig van Beethoven on film
Cultural depictions of Louis XV
1955 drama films
1950s French films
1950s Italian films